The Zambia national badminton team represents Zambia in international badminton team competitions. The team is controlled by the Zambia Badminton Association.

The Zambian team won two runner-up places in the 1982 African Badminton Championships. Their most recent achievement was in 2017 African Badminton Championships where the mixed team got into the semifinals for bronze. The team participated in the 2022 Commonwealth Games.

Zambia made its badminton debut in the Olympics when Eli Mambwe participated in the 2008 Summer Olympics men singles event in Beijing, China.

Participation in African Badminton Championships

Men's team
{| class="wikitable"
|-
! Year !! Result
|-
| 1982 ||  Runner-up
|-
| 2006 ||  Semi-finalist
|-
| 2008 || Group stage
|-
| 2010 || Quarter-finalist
|-
| 2018 || Quarter-finalist
|-
| 2022 || Quarter-finalist
|}Women's team Participation in Africa Games 
Zambia has won a silver and two bronzes in badminton at the African Games. The mixed team debuted in the 2019 African Games and reached the quarterfinals before losing to the Egyptian team.

 List of medalists 

 Players Male playersChongo Mulenga
Kalombo Mulenga
Rodrick Mulenga Mwansa
Juma MuwowoFemale players'''
Elizaberth Chipeleme
Ngandwe Miyambo
Evelyn Siamupangila
Ogar Siamupangila

References

Badminton
National badminton teams
Badminton in Zambia